Paragortonia is a genus of beetles in the family Cerambycidae, containing the following species:

 Paragortonia discoidea (Linsley, 1935)
 Paragortonia leptoforma Chemsak & Noguera, 2001

References

Trachyderini
Cerambycidae genera